"The Cedar Room" is the first single from Doves' debut studio album Lost Souls. The single was released on 20 March 2000 in the UK on CD and 10" vinyl, and charted at number 33 on the UK Singles Chart. The songs "The Cedar Room" and "Zither" made their first appearance on Doves' debut release Cedar EP.

NME named it as the 38th best track of the 2000s.

Track listings

Charts

References

1998 songs
2000 singles
Doves (band) songs
Heavenly Recordings singles
Songs written by Jimi Goodwin
Songs written by Andy Williams (Doves)
Songs written by Jez Williams